Muhammad Mansha Yaad (؛ )  was a writer and playwright from Punjab, Pakistan. He received the Pride of Performance award in 2005 from the Government of Pakistan. He has won many other awards from organizations in various countries which are also listed in this article.

His first short story appeared in 1955 and his first collection of stories was published in 1975. He contributed Urdu and Punjabi stories to many literary magazines. He has published ten collections of short stories, including one in Punjabi, along with a novel in Punjabi, Tanwan Tanwan Tara, and many television series and plays.

Personal life and education
Muhammad Mansha Yaad was born on 5 September 1937 in Thattha Nishtran, a village about 18 kilometer from Farooqabad. He studied in village Gajyana Nau up to 5th grade and completed his matriculation examination from Hafizabad and earned a diploma in engineering from Rasul College in 1955. He passed examinations of Fazil-e-Urdu in 1964, gained a Bachelor of Arts degree in 1965, Masters in Urdu in 1967 and Master in Punjabi in 1972 from University of the Punjab.

He was married in Lahore to his cousin Farhat Nasim Akhtar in 1960. He had one daughter and three sons.

Yaad joined the Pakistan Government Service in 1958 in PWD Rehabilitation in Rawalpindi and Murree for about two years (1958–1960) as a Sub-Engineer, and in 1960, he joined Federal Capital Commission which was later converted into Capital Development Authority (CDA), Islamabad, as Sub-Engineer and then  served as an Assistant Engineer, Executive Engineer, Public Relations Officer & Chief Complaints Officer over time and retired as Deputy Director in 1997.

Death and legacy
Mansha Yaad's mother used to tell young Mansha Punjabi folk songs, tales and popular stories. Dawn (newspaper) in its article on Mansha Yaad remarked, "Such upbringing turned an engineer into a short story writer who emerged as a good quality writer in the subcontinent."

After his retirement, he lived in Islamabad at his residence known as Afsana Manzil ( or "Fiction Destination") and devoted his time to literature and literary events. He died of a heart attack on 15 October 2011 in Islamabad.

Pen name
As a youngster he had a keen interest in poetry and, after considering several pen names, chose "Yaad". His work responsibilities allowed him little time to stay involved in writing and he slowly drifted him apart from poetry. Yet he kept the pen name hoping eventually to return to poetry. As he says: "Didn’t know when smoke may start rising from the poem kiln again".

Works

Short stories
"Band Muthi Main Jugnoo" ("Glow-worms in a closed-Fist"), 
"Maas aur Mitti" 
"Khala Andar Khala" ("Void within Void").
"Waqt Samunder"  
"Wagda Panni (Punjabi Shah Mukhi & Gur Mukhi)"  
"Darakhat Aadmi" 
"Door Ki Awaaz"
"Tamaasha"
"Kwawab Saraay"
"Ik Kankar Thairey Paani Mein"

Novels
Raahain (Urdu Novel)
Taanwan Taanwa Taara  (Noval Punjabi Shah Mukhi & Gur Mukhi  )

Writing for television

Raahain was a serial drama by PTV Lahore centre in 1999. It was based on the Punjabi novel "Tanwa Tanwa Tara" by Yaad. The drama focuses on different societal issue of people both living in urban and rural areas such as the value of education, culture and justice.

Literary activities

In 1972, Yaad founded Halqa Arbab e Zauq, Islamabad, the first prominent literary organization in the capital city.

In Islamabad, he also founded some other literary organizations such as Likhnay Walon Ki Anjuman, Rabta, Bazame Kitab and Fiction Forum, which enriched the newly built city literarily and culturally.

Translations
 Children and Gunpowder
 The Eyes of Jacob
 The Noose
 Replica

Awards and recognition
 Baba Farid Adabi Award for Best Novel Writer (2006)
 Life Time Achievement Award at 12th International Punjabi Conference (2005)
 Pride of Performance Award for Novel and Short Story writing, by the Pakistan Government (2005)
 Life Time Achievement Award by Writers Forum, Islamabad (2004)
 Punjabi Adabi Culture Sangat Award (2004)
 Awarded by Punjabi Likhari Forum, United Kingdom for his Literary Work (2004)
 Exceptional Performance Award by Sadai Adab International (DFW Metroplex UK 2004)

See also

Bano Qudsia
Wasif Ali Wasif
Qudrat Ullah Shahab
Mumtaz Mufti
Ibn-e-Insha

References

External links
 

1937 births
2011 deaths
People from Sheikhupura District
Punjabi people
Punjabi-language writers
Pakistani television writers
Pakistani novelists
Pakistani dramatists and playwrights
Urdu-language novelists
Pakistani male short story writers
Urdu-language short story writers
Pakistani storytellers
Recipients of the Pride of Performance
20th-century novelists
20th-century Pakistani short story writers
20th-century Pakistani male writers
Male television writers